Taruwar Sushil Kohli (born 17 December 1988) is an Indian cricketer. He is a right-handed batsman and a right-arm fast bowler. He has scored 2 triple centuries in first class cricket. He scored a triple hundred in the Ranji Trophy semi-final match against Jharkhand in the 2012-13 season.

Early life and education
Taruwar Kohli was born on 17 December 1988 in Jalandhar, Punjab to Sushil Kohli and Meenu Kohli. His father, Sushil Kohli was a professional swimmer and a water polo player.

Career
Kohli made his debut for Punjab Under-17s in the Vijay Merchant Trophy competition of 2005/06, making five appearances in the competition, and scoring 85* on his debut in a drawn three-day match. Kohli's good form continued throughout the tournament, as he top-scored with 110 in the penultimate match.

Taruwar Kohli was a member of the Indian u-19 Team, which became world cup winners in 2008. As he scored 218 runs in 6 matches which included 3 consecutive fifties, he was the third high scorer of the tournament.

Before the world cup, he captained the Punjab U-19 team which won the one day tournament. He scored unbeaten 118 and took 5 wickets in the semi-finals against Utaar Pradesh.

He scored 79 in his Ranji Trophy debut in 2008/09 session and 58 in his one-day debut.  He scored 700 runs in 7 matches in Colonel Naidu Trophy with three hundreds.(196, 145 & 127).
In Kings XI Cup organised by Kings XI Punjab (KXP), he was awarded as the best batsman of the tournament with three man of the match awards.  He played two matches for KXP during IPL 2009.

He was captain of Punjab U-22 team in 2010/11 season.
He played in T-20 D.Y Patil tournament in 2011 for ONGC and his performance includes the following:-
a) Against Canara Bank: He took 3 wickets for 18 runs in his 4 overs.

b) Against TATA: scored 48 not out in 28 balls and took 1 wicket for 18 runs in 3 overs.

c) Against AIR India (quarter-final): Scored 24 runs in 19 balls and took 4 wickets for 20 runs in 4 overs.

d) Against Indian Oil (semi-final): Scored 23 runs in 13 balls and took 2 wickets for 21 runs in 3 overs.

He played all the matches for Punjab in the Vijay Hazare Cricket One Day Cricket as an All Rounder.  He is fast pace bowler.

2011-2012:
1) 18th Dr.D.Y Patil T-20 Cricket Tournament:
43 runs notout in 30 balls against Air India bowling 4 overs 32 runs 1 wicket.
20 runs in 7 balls against Western Railways.
60 out of 50 balls (Nout Out) against MRF.
2) J.P Attrray Cricket tournament at Mohali in 2011:
42 runs against MRF.
40 runs against Indian Oil.
65 not out against Mohali XI in the Finals, won the tournament.

He played one Ranji match in 2011-2012
played T-20 matches from Punjab 2011–12.
Bowling 4/28/1 against Haryana.
Bowling 4/24 against Delhi.
Bowling 3/15 against Himachal Pradesh.
Batting 20 runs against Services.

He played in the Vinoo Mankad Trophy for the Under-19s team in 2006, and in the Cooch Behar Trophy competition of the same year.

Kohli was made a part of the Indian Under-19s World Cup winning squad in February and March 2008 - which won in the final against the South African team - despite Kohli being dismissed for just a single run in the final.

In IPL 2008, Kohli  played for Rajasthan Royals in the Indian Premier League.
In the second edition of the IPL Kohli represented the Yuvraj Singh led Kings XI Punjab

Against J&K he scored 31 runs in 26 balls with two sixers. He bowled 6 overs giving 25 and took one wicket.
Against Himachal Pradesh he scored 31 runs in 30 balls with two sixes. He also took one catch.
Against Services he scored 7 runs not out and took one catch.
he played the Pre-Quarter-Final match against Mahhrashtra on 5 March at Delhi for Vijay Hazare trophy. He scored 46 runs and played 86 runs partnership with Harbhajan Singh and won the match against Maharashtra.
He will now play against Hyedrabad on 7th of march at delhi in Quarter-Finals.

He was the leading run-scorer for Mizoram in the 2018–19 Vijay Hazare Trophy, with 373 runs in seven matches. He was also the leading wicket-taker, with eight dismissals.

References

External links

1988 births
Living people
Indian cricketers
Rajasthan Royals cricketers
Punjab Kings cricketers
Mizoram cricketers
Punjab, India cricketers
Cricketers from Jalandhar